Daniel Timothy Kildee (born August 11, 1958) is an American politician serving as the U.S. representative for Michigan's 8th congressional district since 2013 (known as the 5th congressional district until 2023). He is a member of the Democratic Party.

From 1977 to 2009, Kildee was a municipal elected official. On November 6, 2012, he was elected the U.S. representative for Michigan's 5th district, succeeding his uncle, Dale Kildee.

Early life and education
Kildee was born in Flint, Michigan. He attended Flint Northern High School and Central Michigan University. In 2008, he finished his coursework at CMU, earning a B.S. in community development administration.

Flint local political career
At age 18, Kildee became one of the nation's youngest elected officials when he was elected to the Flint Board of Education in 1977.

In 1984, Kildee was elected to serve on Genesee County's board of commissioners, subsequently serving for 12 years, including five as chair.

In 1991, he ran for mayor of Flint. He was one of four candidates to challenge incumbent Mayor Matthew Collier in the August 6 nonpartisan primary election. City Councilman Woodrow Stanley finished first with 24% of the vote. Collier ranked second with 23% of the vote, qualifying for the November election. Kildee finished third with 18%.

County Treasurer 
In 1996, Kildee was elected Genesee County Treasurer. He was reelected in 2000, 2004, and 2008. He was reelected in 2008 with 72% of the vote.

Land Bank
In 2002, Kildee helped create the Genesee County Land Bank, a Washington-D.C. based nonprofit organization focused on urban decay. The land bank has helped to clean up vacant and abandoned structures in the community.

The Genessee County Land Bank was the first community land bank in the U.S. The concept of community land banks has since expanded to other U.S. cities.

Center for Community Progress
In 2009, Kildee co-founded and served as president of the Center for Community Progress, a nonprofit focused on urban revitalization. He resigned as county treasurer to oversee the group.

U.S. House of Representatives

Elections

2012

Kildee's uncle, Dale Kildee, served in the House of Representatives representing Michigan's 5th congressional district. In July 2011, Dale Kildee announced he would retire from Congress. Dan Kildee declared his candidacy for the House on November 1, 2011. He was unchallenged in the Democratic primary. In the November election, he defeated Republican State Representative Jim Slezak, 65% to 31%.

Tenure
In January 2013, then-House Minority Whip Steny Hoyer appointed Kildee assistant whip. His fellow freshmen Democratic members elected Kildee to serve as their representative to the caucus's Steering and Policy Committee.

In 2019, Kildee helped secure $11.2 million in federal funding to demolish blighted homes in Saginaw. He supported Steny Hoyer's "Make it in America" legislation, which would remove tax breaks for companies that move jobs overseas.

In a September 2016 speech on the U.S. House floor, Kildee claimed that House Republican leaders were refusing to approve emergency aid to Flint because a majority of its residents are Black. Congress passed a funding measure that provided $170 million in aid to communities including Flint that sought infrastructure improvements for their water.

In April 2018, Kildee, Jared Huffman, Jamie Raskin, and Jerry McNerney launched the Congressional Freethought Caucus.

As of September 2022, Kildee had voted in line with Joe Biden's stated position 100% of the time.

Political positions

Gun policy
In 2022, Kildee voted for H.R. 1808: Assault Weapons Ban of 2022.

Abortion 
Kildee is a supporter of abortion rights and emphasized the issue during his 2022 reelection race. In September 2022, he hosted a reproductive rights roundtable alongside Representative Sara Jacobs in Midland, Michigan.

COVID-19 policy
On January 31, 2023, Kildee voted against H.R.497:Freedom for Health Care Workers Act, a bill which would lift COVID-19 vaccine mandates for healthcare workers.

On February 1, 2023, Kildee voted against a resolution to end COVID-19 national emergency.

Inflation
Kildee voted for the Inflation Reduction Act. Kildee has attributed the rising rates of inflation to the 2022 Russian invasion of Ukraine.

Immigration
In 2019, Kildee voted for Alexandria Ocasio-Cortez's amendment to H.R. 2500, which would prohibit the president from deploying troops on the southern border to enforce immigration law.

Impeachment of Donald Trump
Kildee voted to impeach then-president Donald Trump in both 2019 and 2021. On July 27, 2019, he was one of 95 Democrats to vote against the motion to table H. Res. 498, which would table the impeachment inquiry into Trump.

Filibuster
Kildee has criticized the 60-vote majority Senate rule and compared it to Jim Crow Era laws.

Electric vehicles
Kildee introduced legislation that included a provision for a $7,500 tax credit for electric vehicle buyers.

Private property
In 2014, Kildee voted against H.R. 1944: The Private Property Rights Protection Act of 2014, which would have prohibited government use of eminent domain for the purpose of economic development.

Religion
In April 2018, Kildee, Jared Huffman, Jamie Raskin, and Jerry McNerney launched the Congressional Freethought Caucus. The Freethought Caucus advocates for more non-religious representation in Congress and opposes state promotion of religion.

Reparations
Kildee is a sponsor of H.R. 40, the Commission to Study and Develop Reparation Proposals for African Americans Act. The bill would allow history books to go into more depth on African American struggles and set up a reparations commission for those with enslaved ancestors.

Syria
In 2013, Kildee voted in favor of intervention and arming the Syrian Opposition against Bashar al-Assad and ISIS.

Trade
In 2022, Kildee was among the representatives to sign a letter calling on President Joe Biden to lift tariffs on China.

Ukraine
Kildee has voted in favor of aid to Ukraine.

Voting rights
Kildee voted for the Ayanna Pressley amendment to H.R. 1, the Voting Rights Act which would lower the voting age to 16.

On February 9, 2023, Kildee voted against H.J.Res. 24: Disapproving the action of the District of Columbia Council in approving the Local Resident Voting Rights Amendment Act of 2022 which condemns the District of Columbia’s plan that would allow noncitizens to vote in local elections.

Committee assignments
Ways and Means Committee
House Budget Committee

Caucus memberships
 Congressional Progressive Caucus
 Afterschool Caucuses
Congressional Freethought Caucus
Blue Collar Caucus
 House Pro-Choice Caucus

Gubernatorial campaigns

Kildee was a candidate in the 2010 Michigan gubernatorial election, setting up an exploratory committee and filing to run. He ultimately dropped out of the race. He was also rumored to be considering a run in the 2018 Michigan gubernatorial election, but publicly declared he would not run.

Personal life
Kildee has been married to Jennifer Kildee since 1988. They have three children.

References

External links

Congressman Dan Kildee official U.S. House website
Campaign website

|-

|-

20th-century American politicians
21st-century American politicians
Central Michigan University alumni
County commissioners in Michigan
County treasurers in Michigan
Democratic Party members of the United States House of Representatives from Michigan
Left-wing populism in the United States
Living people
Politicians from Flint, Michigan
University of Michigan–Flint alumni
1958 births